Denis Istomin and Evgeny Korolev did not defend their 2009 title.
Top seed Filip Polášek and Igor Zelenay won in the final 3–6, 6–4, [10–5], against Ruben Bemelmans and Yannick Mertens.

Seeds

Draw

Draw

References
 Main Draw

Ethias Trophy - Doubles
2010 Ethias Trophy